Ikaris is a fictional character appearing in American comic books published by Marvel Comics. He first appeared in The Eternals #1 (July 1976) and was created by Jack Kirby.  The character is depicted as a member of a race known as the Eternals.

Richard Madden played Ikaris in the Marvel Cinematic Universe, debuting in Eternals (2021).

Publication history

Ikaris first appeared in Eternals #1 (July 1976) and was created by Jack Kirby.

Neil Gaiman, with artist John Romita, Jr., created a 2006 miniseries, which helped bring the Eternals' role in the modern Marvel Universe up-to-date. Originally solicited as a six-issue series, an extra issue was added to the run, because, according to editor Nick Lowe, "There was too much story to fit into the structure we set for ourselves. Neil was starting issue five and told me that he might need a seventh issue. He just had too much story to fit in six issues (even with the first and sixth double-sized)".

Ikaris also appears in All-New Invaders as a villain, when he is controlled by the Kree, who use the God's Whisper on him.

Fictional character biography

Origins
Ikaris was born over 20,000 years ago in Polaria, in the area now known as Siberia. He is the son of the Eternals Virako and Tulayn.  His real birth name is unknown.

When the Second Host of the Celestials sank the Deviant Lemuria in what is known as the "Great Cataclysm", Ikaris guides a ship of humans to safety. The humans mistake Ikaris for a bird, and (per Marvel Universe history) he is memorialized as the dove that guided Noah to the Mountains of Ararat (Eternals #2).

Early centuries
Ikaris chose his name due to a tragic accident hundreds of years ago. While fighting the Deviants in ancient Greece, the man eventually known as Ikaris meets and weds a human woman. Together they bear a son named Icarus, who loves to soar with his father high above the seas and mountains of Greece. In time, the Eternal builds his son a set of mechanical wings so the boy can fly on his own.

When his father disappears while fighting the Deviants, the young Icarus seeks him out using the mechanical wings. Too inexperienced to fly on his own, young Icarus soars too high, loses consciousness in the upper atmosphere, and falls to his death. Finding his son dead, the father Eternal takes the name of his son, Ikaris, in his memory.

Around 1000 AD, Virako, Ikaris' father, dies in battle against the Deviant Dromedan. Ikaris is then adopted by his uncle Valkin, who reveals to him his secret Arctic home, the Pyramid of the Winds.

At some point during the early centuries, Ikaris and the Eternals would come into conflict with the immortal mutant, Apocalypse. This conflict would end with Ikaris and the Eternals defeating him, and Ikaris believing Apocalypse to be dead.

In 1823, as part of the Eternals' preparation for the coming of the Fourth Host of the Celestials, Zuras orders Ikaris to perfect his cosmic senses in anticipation of their coming.  When they draw near, Ikaris is ordered to go to the City of the Space Gods and revive the sleeping Eternal Ajak to greet them.

Modern Era

When the Celestials arrive on Earth around a century and a half later, Ikaris succeeds in this mission with the aid of human archaeologist Dr. Daniel Damian and his daughter, Margo. Ikaris witnesses the arrival of the Fourth Celestial Host on Earth. He then publicly reveals himself as all Eternals do. He later battles a "cosmic Hulk" robot, and fights Dromedan. During the Fourth Host, Valkin's son Druig captures and tortures Ikaris to force him to reveal the location of the Pyramid of the Winds. Ikaris catches up with Druig and kills him, but not before Druig is able to fire a weapon at a Celestial; the Celestial, however, is unharmed.

Later, he encountered Thor for the first time. He next participated in a battle between the Eternals and the Olympian gods defeating Ares. Not long after that, he learned of the demise of Zuras, the Prime Eternal (leader of Earth's Eternals).

Later, it was revealed how Ikaris first encountered the Inhumans. Ikaris was later captured with the other Eternals by a Deviant army. He joined with the other Eternals and Iron Man (Jim Rhodes) in defeating the Deviants. After that, Ikaris battled Maelstrom alongside the other Eternals and the Avengers. After the battle, he was selected by the Uni-Mind to remain on Earth.

During his long lifetime, Ikaris also attempts to be a fair and just leader of the Eternals, but has abandoned Eternal traditions to take an active and public role in protecting the human race. He has even adopted a unique human identity by becoming a professional wrestler with the Unlimited Class Wrestling Federation as "Iceberg" Ike Harris. Ikaris and fellow Eternal Thena have had a strong dislike for each other for a long time, and find themselves coming to conflict when she is appointed as Prime Eternal. Questioning her worth as Prime Eternal, Ikaris faces her in the Hall of Eternal Judgment and defeats her, becoming the new Prime Eternal. Ikaris then battled Ghaur alongside the Eternals, Thor, and the West Coast Avengers. He also buried Margo Damian when she was killed by a Deviant experiment.

Later, with the other Eternals, Ikaris captured the Silver Surfer on behalf of the High Evolutionary. Some time after that, he was captured by the Deviant leader Brother Visara, and then freed by Kro. Ikaris exposed Dr. Damian as the Eternals' enemy, and battled a transformed Ajak as a result.

When the Eternal Sersi became sick with the Mahd Wy'ry disease, a uncurable degenerating Eternal disease, Ikaris and others eternals tried to bring her to Olympia and perform a rite of Cleansing. However Sersi rejected the idea, on the basis that the ritual was designed to kill the infected Eternal, and solicited his family to perform  the Gann Josin bond between her and her lover the Black Knight. Ikaris was infuriated by the idea, and performed the bond without consent of the Knight.

In The New Eternals series, Ikaris still retains the title of Prime Eternal. Ikaris and the Eternals' ancient nemesis Apocalypse returned to detonate a nuclear warhead on Deviant Lemuria. He causes Ikaris's father Virako to return to life. Ikaris confronts, and fights Apocalypse. Although Ikaris is defeated by Apocalypse, Ikaris still manages to destroy his ship and thwart Apocalypse's plan. Virako is appalled to find the Eternals accepting Deviants such as Ransak the Reject and Karkas. Under the alias of "Sovereign", he briefly introduces the Eternals to the world as a team of super-heroes called the "New Breed".

Changed Reality (Eternals mini-series-2006)
Ikaris was featured again in the Marvel mini-series Eternals, written by Neil Gaiman and penciled by artist John Romita, Jr. The Eternals were the victims of memory and reality manipulation by former Eternal Sprite, and thus have forgotten their true identities. Ikaris visited Mark Curry, to try to awaken/remember his past but he rebuked him. Although Ikaris (calling himself Ike Harris) was captured and atomized by two Deviants agents, Gelt and Morjak, his body reappears at the bottom of the (fictional) Antarctic city of Olympia. His body and powers fully restored by the sentient city, Ikaris regains his memories and sets out to awaken his fellow Eternals to their true identities. After a prolonged battle, he at last unites the few Eternals present. He then plans to team up with Makkari and reawaken the ninety other Eternals.

Eternals' search (Eternals – Volume 4)
At the end of the last volume, Makkari has been chosen as the "chosen one" that the awakened Dreaming Celestial communicates with. This is very frustrating to Ajak because he has spent his entire existence communing with the Celestials, their language and what their showing up means. In conversations between Makkari and the Dreaming Celestial,the eternal learned that the Celestials picks or create a planet and seed it with life forms. They then create 100 Eternals and 100 Deviants. The Celestials then keep a watchful eye on the planet and weigh which of the two races influences the life forms more. This is done in servitude of the Fulcrum. If the Deviants influence has more prominence, the Celestials send the Horde to eradicate the race and they start over. If it is the Eternals, the Celestials allow the goodness to flow back into the Fulcrum, which the Celestials seems to serve. These conversations between Makkari and the Dreaming Celestial take place on a different plane of existence and cause Makkari's body to shut down, seemingly almost dying, which Sersi is concerned with because she thinks he is addicted to this state. We also see here the origin of the Dreaming Celestial and how he came to be put to sleep by the other Celestials.

Next the story picks up with Thena and Ikaris, trying to find all of the other amnesiac Eternals and reminding them of who they are. They find that a similar effort is being conducted by Druig, who is now the ruler of Vorozheika. Druig is using a secret source to find the Eternals and is winning in the contest of finding and converting more Eternals to his cause. Ikaris and Thena approach Phastos, who thinks he is an engineer in Sweden named Phillip Voss. Thena tries to trigger his memory with questions about his past under the guise that she and Ikaris are attorneys executing the will of a deceased relative of Mr. Voss'. This ploy proves to be a failure and Ikaris just wants to force the memories on the Eternals who have lost their memories, but this also causes problems as they react violently to having their world's turned upside down like this.

We then see that Thena prior to her trip with Ikaris to visit Phastos, she leaves her son Joey Eliot in the care of her father: Zuras who seems a little absent-minded. Zuras begins to explore and show the different parts of the Eternals' habitat with Joey. It is here we learn that the Horde that the Dreaming Celestial has spoken of, that is coming to Earth has an agent already on Earth who is bonded to a human via a symbiotic relationship. This turns out to be Thena's son Joey. Joey is then seen going into a trance-like state when viewing new and unexplored areas of the habitat and information and transmitting that information back to the Horde. Sersi investigates and finds out about this through tracing a signal that is being sent from the habitat to the Horde and she informs Zuras of this fact. Zuras scoffs at this notion and Joey's life is terminated by the symbiote who determines that he has been detected.

Makkari learns of Joey and his death from the Dreaming Celestial. He immediately goes to the habitat of the Eternals—Olympia. Then Ajak comes up on the scene of a "Burning Man"-like party being held at the foot of the Dreaming Celestial. He attacks and disperses the worshippers there and is approached by Iron Man's strike team called the Order. Ajak uses a "jedi mind trick" to send the Order away, and Ikaris shows up to have him go undercover inside Druig's stronghold. Ajak agrees and he soon is put to task to find Gilgamesh. Ajak finds him and convinces him that Thena, and Ikaris are possessed by the Deviants and their influence. Eventually Gilgamesh attacks Makkari and beats him violently, leaving to finish his attack against other Eternals. Ajak shows up in the aftermath of Gilgamesh's attack and atomizes Makkari, knowing that he will be given a new body and regenerated in one of the chambers in Olympus like their race has used for thousands of years. Makkari's death makes it necessary for the Dreaming Celestial, who does not have anyone to communicate with, use a failsafe that puts all humanoids asleep on the planet, except Eternals and Deviants.

Gilgamesh resumes his attack when he reaches Olympus and Thena barely defeats him, but only after he destroys the reassembling chamber that Makkari needs to reconstitute. Sersi then attacks the Dreaming Celestial and is told that she was given heightened powers to care for Makkari while he assisted the Dreaming Celestial in cataloging all super-powered beings on the planet. She then uses her powers to reconstitute Makkari, which stops the need for the failsafe of the Dreaming Celestial. And surprisingly when all of the humans awaken from their sleep, so too does Joey Eliot, ending Thena's sadness at the loss of her son. The Watcher mentions to the Dreaming Celestial that the child was dead and the Dreaming Celestial revived him. The Dreaming Celestial replies that the child was asleep like the rest of the humans and simply woke up when the rest did. The Watcher objects, and then realizes that the Dreaming Celestial has done this as an act of kindness, explained away as the child being simply asleep like the rest of the humans.

Death
Later when the Final Host arrived on Earth, Ikaris along with all the Eternals killed themselves after realizing the true purpose for which they were created. He was the last Eternal still alive when Iron Man and Doctor Strange traveled to the Mountains of Greece, to try to get some answers from The Eternals. Before his death, he told the heroes the reason for the mass suicide.

Powers and abilities
Ikaris' life force is augmented by cosmic energy and he has total mental control over his physical form and bodily processes even when he is asleep or unconscious. As a result, he is virtually immortal, immune to disease and aging, and invulnerable to conventional forms of injury. Should Ikaris be injured somehow, he could regenerate any injured or missing tissue. Cosmic energy bolsters Ikaris's metabolism so that he does not tire from any physical exertion. He can resist temperature extremes through mental concentration.

Ikaris can levitate himself by mentally manipulating gravitons around himself. He can also levitate other persons and objects, even while simultaneously levitating himself. Ikaris is able to fly via self-levitation at approximately 850 miles per hour, which is faster than most other Eternals.

Ikaris has low level psychic abilities, enabling him to scan the superficial thoughts of any mind less adept than his own. He can mentally create illusions so as to disguise himself. Ikaris can also psionically manipulate atoms and molecules so as to transform an object's shape. However, Ikaris is only a second-level adept on a five level scale (the fifth level being the highest) in this discipline. He can rearrange molecules in the air so as to create a virtually impenetrable shield about himself.

Ikaris can project cosmic energy in the form of beams from his eyes or beams and flashes from his hands. This cosmic energy, stored in specialized enclaves of cells in his body, can be used as force, heat, light, and possibly other forms of electromagnetic energy. Ikaris can project a maximum concussive force of at least 260 pounds per square inch. He can project heat of a maximum temperature of at least 3,000 Fahrenheit, hot enough to melt iron. It takes about one minute for him to attain this maximum temperature. Because Ikaris's heat beams can vaporize solid objects, they are often called his disintegrator beams, The maximum range for his energy beams is about 200 feet. Ikaris is a fourth level adept on a five-level scale (the fifth level being the highest) in this discipline. The expenditure of cosmic energy in this way continually for several hours will temporarily deplete Ikaris's physical strength, but not his resistance to injury, although it will temporarily increase his sensitivity to pain. He will rapidly return to normal after such lengthy energy expenditure is over.

Ikaris can teleport himself psionically, but prefers not to do so, since, like other Eternals, he finds the self-teleportation process physically unpleasant. He can also teleport other people along with himself.

Reception
 In 2021, CBR.com ranked Ikaris 5th in their "15 Most Powerful Eternals" list.
 In 2021, Screen Rant ranked Ikaris 4th in their "10 Most Powerful Members Of The Eternals" list
 In 2021, CBR.com ranked Ikaris 5th in their "10 Strongest Characters From Eternals Comics" list.

Other versions

Marvel 2099
There is an alternate future version of Ikaris in the Marvel 2099 universe. He appears in 2099: Manifest Destiny.

The Eternal
Chuck Austen wrote The Eternal, a 2003-2004 Marvel MAX series which showed the arrival of Ikaris' parents on Earth, in this version Ikaeden and Jeska, and his plan for the story involved "going back in time to see Ikaris birth and development on Earth, meet his parents, and then [we] move forward into contemporary time".

In other media

Television
 Ikaris appears in Marvel Knights: Eternals, voiced by Trevor Devall.

Film
 Ikaris appears in Eternals, portrayed by Richard Madden. In the film's story, Ikaris kills Ajak when he realizes that she wants to go against Arishem's plan for the Emergence, which would have destroyed life on Earth. He betrays the rest of the Eternals, but is ultimately brought down by his love for Sersi. Not able to forgive himself, he flies into the sun, much like his mythological namesake.

Video games 
 Ikaris appears as an unlockable playable character in Marvel Future Fight. An Ikaris costume, based on the MCU character, was later added during the tie-in event to the release of Eternals.
 Ikaris appears as an unlockable playable character in Marvel Contest of Champions.
 Ikaris appears as an unlockable playable character in Marvel Super War.
 Ikaris appears as an unlockable playable character in Marvel Strike Force.
 Ikaris appears as an unlockable playable character in Marvel Puzzle Quest.
 Ikaris appears as a companion character in Marvel Future Revolution.

Web series
 Ikaris appears in Marvel Heroes MMO: Chronicles of Doom, voiced by Wally Wingert.

References

External links
 Ikaris at the Marvel Universe
 Ikaris at the Marvel Directory
 
 

Characters created by Jack Kirby
Comics characters introduced in 1976
Fictional characters with energy-manipulation abilities
Fictional characters with fire or heat abilities
Fictional characters with superhuman durability or invulnerability
Marvel Comics characters who can move at superhuman speeds
Marvel Comics characters who can teleport
Marvel Comics characters who have mental powers
Marvel Comics characters with accelerated healing
Marvel Comics characters with superhuman strength
Eternals (comics)